Ruth Chao may refer to:

 Ruth Chao (designer) (born 1988), creative director and graphic artist in Hong Kong
 Ruth Mulan Chu Chao (1930–2007), Chinese American philanthropist
 Ruth K. Chao, American psychologist